Continental Airlines Flight 1883 was a Boeing 757 that mistakenly landed on a taxiway at Newark Liberty International Airport on the evening of October 28, 2006. There were no reported injuries or damage, but the narrowly averted disaster was investigated by the National Transportation Safety Board, and caused the Federal Aviation Administration to reevaluate and modify air and ground safety procedures at and around Newark Airport.

Aircraft and flight information
Continental Airlines Flight 1883 was a regularly scheduled domestic passenger flight to Newark from Orlando International Airport in Orlando, Florida. On October 28, 2006, the flight was operated using a Boeing 757-224, a narrow-body twin-engine jet airliner (registration number N17105).  Flight 1883 had 148 passengers and 6 crew on board.

The first officer was flying the aircraft for the approach to Newark; it was his first time landing at Newark on runway 29.

Incident
Flight 1883 approached Newark from the north, initially planning to land on runway 22L using an ILS  instrument approach. This required descending toward runway 22L, followed by a low altitude circling maneuver that required a right turn at only  to line up for runway 29.

As the flight crew descended and turned toward the airport, they observed four white path indicator lights, which they believed were located to the left of the runway. This was incorrect; the instrument procedures for Newark described these indicator lights as being to the right of the runway. The aircraft then taxied to the gate where all passengers were deplaned. According to the FAA, all lighting systems associated with runway 29 and taxiway Z were operating normally at the time.

Investigation

The incident was investigated by the National Transportation Safety Board (NTSB).

As part of its investigation, the NTSB conducted a flight around the airport, to evaluate the lighting and visibility of the runways and taxiways.  With the lighting of runway 29 and the taxiway set to the same brightness levels used during the incident, the NTSB noted that the lights for taxiway Z appeared slightly brighter than the lights for runway 29. During testing, however, the difference in lighting color (green centerline lights used on Z to indicate a taxiway, white centerline lights used on 29 to indicate a runway) was clearly visible to planes on approach.

In its final report, the NTSB described the probable cause of the incident as:

Aftermath

This rare event caused a reassessment of differential runway and taxiway lighting, as well as arrival procedures at Newark airport. The NTSB noted in its report that as a result of the incident, the FAA instituted two types of changes in its procedures, in the air and on the ground, to reduce the chance of a recurrence. In the air, the FAA added two new arrival procedures, GIMEE 19-7-1 and GRITY 19-7-1A, which it expects will provide improved navigational guidance to the runway under similar conditions. On the ground, the FAA and airport officials increased the difference between the lighting intensities of taxiways and runways, to enable pilots to better differentiate between them under low light conditions.

Both pilots were grounded by the airline after the incident but were returned to duty after retraining.

N17105 was later transferred to United Airlines in 2010, following their merger with Continental. It is still in service with United as of January 2023.

See also
 List of accidents and incidents involving commercial aircraft
 Air Canada Flight 759, a similar incident that took place in July 2017

References

External links
GoogleMaps aerial view of runway 29 and taxiway Z
 NASA ASRS Report describing taxiway incident

Continental Airlines 1883
2006 in New Jersey
Airliner accidents and incidents in New Jersey
1883
Aviation accidents and incidents in the United States in 2006
History of Newark, New Jersey
October 2006 events in the United States
Newark Liberty International Airport
21st century in Newark, New Jersey